The 1952–53 SK Rapid Wien season was the 55th season in club history.

Squad

Squad and statistics

Squad statistics

Fixtures and results

League

References

1952-53 Rapid Wien Season
Rapid